Desert Raiders (Italian: Il dominatore del deserto) is a 1964 Italian adventure film directed by Tanio Boccia and starring Kirk Morris, Rosalba Neri and Hélène Chanel. It was one of a large number of peplum films made during the era.

The story consists of a hero saves a beautiful young princess from a forced marriage to an evil villain.

Cast
 Kirk Morris as Nadir 
 Rosalba Neri as Fátima  
 Hélène Chanel as Zaira  
 Paul Muller as Yussuf  
 Aldo Bufi Landi as Salad  
 Ugo Sasso as Omar  
 Furio Meniconi as El Krim  
 Rinaldo Zamperla 
 Geneviève Audry as Shireen  
 Edda Ferronao
 Franco Pechini 
 Nadir Moretti as Ibrahim 
 Rina Mascetti 
 Luigi Scavran 
 Wladimiro Tuicovich

References

Bibliography 
 Susanna Buffa. Un musicista per il cinema: Carlo Rustichelli, un profilo artistico. Carocci, 2004.

External links 
 

1964 adventure films
Italian adventure films
1964 films
1960s Italian-language films
Films directed by Tanio Boccia
Films scored by Carlo Rustichelli
1960s Italian films